iQue, Ltd. is a Chinese video game/game localization and support development company located in Suzhou. It was founded as a joint venture between Wei Yen and Nintendo in 2002 as a Chinese video game console manufacturing company. The following year, the company released the iQue Player. The company had manufactured and distributed official Nintendo products for the mainland Chinese market under the iQue brand until 2018.

iQue only released portable Nintendo games for 3DS XL, DS, Game Boy Advance, and Game Boy Advance SP. The iQue Player is the only home console available from the company in China. There were plans to release the Wii in all of China but when Satoru Iwata officially announced the release date for it on September 20, 2007, he said it would only be available in Hong Kong, under the Nintendo brand. The Nintendo DSi was released in China in December 2009 as iQue DSi. The Nintendo 3DS XL was released in China as iQue 3DS XL in December 2012. By 2013, the company became a fully owned subsidiary of Nintendo.

The company worked on the emulators for NES and Game Boy on Virtual Console for 3DS and Nintendo 64 for the Wii U in the beginning of the 2010s, while on Nintendo Switch, the company was responsible for the Nintendo 64 emulator for Nintendo Switch Online.

By 2018, Nintendo had ceased any official distribution of older game consoles into mainland China under the iQue brand. Nintendo partnered with Tencent to bring the Nintendo Switch into the Chinese market at the end of 2019. Since 2017, iQue continues operations by offering consumer support for any previously released products, and translating and localizing new games released worldwide by Nintendo into simplified Chinese while Nintendo Hong Kong do traditional Chinese.

In 2019, iQue began to hire for developers with programmers and testers, indicating that the company was transitioning to be a development company to support game projects for the division Nintendo EPD.

iQue Player

The iQue Player is a micro variant of a home video game console by iQue that plays ports of Nintendo 64 games. It was uniquely designed to bypass China's ban on home console products placed at the time. 14 games came out for the console. The Legend of Zelda: Majora's Mask and a Traditional Chinese translation of Ocarina of Time were completed, but not released by iQue.

iQue Game Boy Advance

iQue Game Boy Advance
The iQue GBA is the Chinese version of the Game Boy Advance. It was released on 8 June 2004. 8 games have been released for the console. 12 more games were planned, but cancelled after high piracy of the system.

Cancelled Games

iQue Game Boy SP
The iQue Game Boy SP is the Chinese version of the Game Boy Advance SP. It is the same as a regular Game Boy Advance SP but has an "iQue" logo on the top of the casing instead of "Nintendo". It plays Game Boy, Game Boy Color and Game Boy Advance games and has a rechargeable battery. It was released in October 2004.

iQue Game Boy Micro
The iQue Micro is the Chinese version of the Game Boy Micro, and the smallest of the iQue family. It plays Game Boy Advance games. It was released in October 2005.

iQue DS

iQue DS
The iQue DS is the Chinese version of the Nintendo DS. It was released on July 23, 2005. 6 games have been released for the console. It is the only version of the Nintendo DS to have a regional lockout, so iQue DS games cannot be played on Nintendo DS systems from other regions. 
A Chinese version of Big Brain Academy was also planned, but cancelled. It appeared on the official iQue DS Lite trailer. 
Games:

iQue DS Lite
The iQue DS Lite is the Chinese version of the Nintendo DS Lite. It plays Nintendo DS games and it is smaller than the original DS and it has a brighter screen than the original DS. It was released in June 2006.

iQue DSi
The iQue DSi is the Chinese version of the Nintendo DSi. It has a camera and it plays both DS and DSiWare games. It also comes with Nintendogs pre-installed in the system. It was released in December 2009.

iQue 3DS XL

The iQue 3DS XL is the Chinese Version of the Nintendo 3DS XL. It was the only version of the 3DS offered by iQue. Unlike the Nintendo 3DS XL from other regions, the iQue 3DS XL doesn't have a Nintendo eShop, save data can't be transferred from an iQue DSi to an iQue 3DS XL or between systems and iQue DSiWare can't be played on an iQue 3DS XL. Only 2 games have been released for the console and they were both preinstalled on every console made. No physical game cards were ever made.

Games:

Due to the regional lockout, only games that provide simplified Chinese interface language can be used in iQue 3DS XL. Besides the two games listed above which were released by iQue, the following 14 games released by Nintendo Hong Kong and Nintendo Taiwan can also be used on this console and include a simplified Chinese interface language:

Comparison

References

External links
  

 
Companies based in Suzhou
Video game companies established in 2002
Chinese companies established in 2002
Manufacturing companies of China
First-party video game developers
Nintendo divisions and subsidiaries
Privately held companies of China
Video game companies of China
Video game development companies
Chinese brands